Raguhn is a town and a former municipality in the district of Anhalt-Bitterfeld, Saxony-Anhalt, Germany. Since 1 January 2010, it has been part of the town Raguhn-Jeßnitz.

References

Towns in Saxony-Anhalt
Former municipalities in Saxony-Anhalt
Raguhn-Jeßnitz
Duchy of Anhalt